Uranian (from Ancient Greek  ) is a historical term for homosexual men. The word was also used as an adjective in association with male homosexuality or inter-male attraction regardless of sexual orientation.

An early use of the term appears in Friedrich Schiller's 'Sixth Letter' in the Aesthetic Education of Man (1795–96). Schiller claims that state institutions are so jealous they would rather share their servants with a Cytherean Venus than a Uranian Venus.  
The term was used by activist Karl Heinrich Ulrichs in a series of five booklets from 1864 to 1865 collected under the title  (The Riddle of Man–Manly Love). The term uranian was adopted by English-language advocates of homosexual emancipation in the Victorian era, such as Edward Carpenter and John Addington Symonds, who used it to describe a comradely love that would bring about true democracy. Oscar Wilde once wrote to his lover Robert Ross in an undated letter, "To have altered my life would have been to have admitted that uranian love is ignoble. I hold it to be noble—more noble than other forms."

The term Uranians also designates a group of writers who studied classics and wrote pederastic poetry from roughly the 1870s to the 1930s. The writings of this group came to be known by the phrase Uranian poetry. The art of Henry Scott Tuke and Wilhelm von Gloeden is also sometimes referred to as Uranian.

Etymology

Ulrichs derived uranian ( in German) from a dialogue on eros, in particular male love, metaphorized by the birth of Greek goddess Aphrodite from Plato's work Symposium.

In this dialogue, Pausanias distinguishes between two types of love, symbolized by two different accounts of the birth of Aphrodite, the goddess of love.  was derived from Aphrodite Urania, who was created out of the god Uranus' semen, a birth in which "female has no part", therefore representing love between men. Its counterpart, dionian ( in German), was derived from Aphrodite Dionea, the daughter of Zeus and Dione, associated with a common love which "is apt to be of women as well as of youths, and is of the body rather than of the soul," representing for Ulrichs men's love for women. Diverging from Plato's account of masculine love, Ulrichs understood male  to be essentially feminine and male  to be masculine in nature.

Ulrichs developed his terminology before the first public use of the term gay.

John Addington Symonds was one of the first to take up the term uranian in the English language and is also responsible for its connection with Ulrichs' .

See also
 Emergence of the LGBT movement

References

External links 
 

1860s neologisms
19th century in LGBT history
Gay men
Homosexuality
LGBT terminology
Male homosexuality
Sexual orientation

de:Karl Heinrich Ulrichs#Urninge und Dioninge